Saint Vincent and the Grenadines is an island state in the Windward Islands of the Lesser Antilles, an island arc of the Caribbean Sea in North America. The country consists of the main island of Saint Vincent and the northern two-thirds of the Grenadines, a chain of small islands stretching south from Saint Vincent to Grenada. Its total land area is 390 km2 of which 342.7 km2 is the main island of Saint Vincent. The country's capital is at Kingstown on Saint Vincent.

Table of Islands

The main island of Saint Vincent and the Grenadines is Saint Vincent. Its geography is mostly mountainous and includes very little level ground. There is also a large difference between the coastlines on each side of the island; the windward side is very rocky, while the leeward side consists of many sandy beaches and has many more bays. The island's (as well as the country's) highest peak is the volcanic Soufrière at 1,234 m. There are several tiny islets offshore of Saint Vincent including Young Island and the Cow And Calves Islands.

List of islands from north to south: 

The remainder of the Grenadines to the south are administered by Grenada.

Resources and land use
Natural resources:
hydropower, cropland

Land use:
arable land:
10%
permanent crops:
18%
permanent pastures:
5%
forests and woodland:
36%
other:
31% (1993 est.)

Extreme points

 Northernmost point: West Point, Charlotte Parish/Saint David Parish
 Easternmost point: Black Point, Charlotte Parish
 Southernmost point (St Vincent only): Headland near Johnson Point, Saint George Parish
 Southernmost point: Cross Pointe, Petit Saint Vincent, Grenadines Parish
 Westernmost point (St Vincent only): Headland west of Bambaroo, Saint Patrick Parish
 Westernmost point: Miss Irene Point, Union Island, Grenadines Parish

Irrigated land:
10 km2 (1993 est.)

Natural hazards:
hurricanes; Soufrière on the island of Saint Vincent is a constant threat

Environment - current issues:
pollution of coastal waters and shorelines from discharges by pleasure yachts and other effluents; in some areas, pollution is severe enough to make swimming prohibitive

Environment - international agreements:
party to:
Biodiversity, Climate Change, Desertification, Endangered Species, Environmental Modification, Hazardous Wastes, Law of the Sea, Ozone Layer Protection, Ship Pollution, Whaling
signed, but not ratified:
Climate Change-Kyoto Protocol

Geography - note:
the administration of the islands of the Grenadines group is divided between Saint Vincent and the Grenadines and Grenada

See also

 Saint Vincent (island)
 Grenadines
 Parishes of Saint Vincent and the Grenadines
 List of Caribbean islands: Saint Vincent and the Grenadines
Outline of Saint Vincent and the Grenadines
Index of Saint Vincent and the Grenadines-related articles
List of cities in Saint Vincent and the Grenadines

Notes

External links

References

 
Subdivisions of Saint Vincent and the Grenadines
Islands of Saint Vincent and the Grenadines